The 2021 Nepal Super League was the first season of the Nepal Super League, the first professional franchise based club football league of Nepal. A total of seven franchises participated in the tournament played at the Dasharath Rangasala from 24 April to 15 May 2021. Kathmandu Rayzrs won the title after beating Dhangadhi FC in the final on 15 May 2021.

Venue
All matches were held at the Dasarath Rangasala in Kathmandu, Nepal.

Teams

Personnel and sponsorship

Personnel changes

Foreign players 

One team can recruit three overseas players and field two at a time.

Regular season

League Table

Results

Round robin

Playoffs

Bracket

Preliminary

Final

Season statistics

Scoring

Top scorers

Hat-tricks

Clean sheets

Awards

End-of-season awards

References

External links
Nepal Super League 2021

2020–21 in Nepalese football
2021 in Asian association football leagues
2021